Duncan Fraser McClure (10 June 1913 – May 1991) was a Scottish footballer who played as a left back, with Heart of Midlothian being his only club at professional level; taking all cups and unofficial wartime competitions into account, he made over 400 appearances for the Edinburgh club. He was selected to play for Scotland in an unofficial wartime international fixture in 1940.

After retiring as a player, McClure continued to work for Hearts for eight more years as a coach and scout, with Alex Young being one of his 'spots' in 1954.

References

1913 births
1991 deaths
Footballers from South Ayrshire
People from Troon
Association football fullbacks
Scottish footballers
Heart of Midlothian F.C. players
Parkhead F.C. players
Scottish Football League players
Scottish Junior Football Association players
Scotland wartime international footballers
Association football scouts
Heart of Midlothian F.C. non-playing staff